Trichodesma is a genus of flowering plants in the borage family, Boraginaceae. There are about 40 to 45 species distributed in tropical and subtropical regions of Africa, Asia, and Australia.

Species include:
Trichodesma africanum
Trichodesma calycosum
Trichodesma incanum
Trichodesma indicum
Trichodesma laxiflorum Balf.f.
Trichodesma microcalyx Balf.f.
Trichodesma scotti Balf.f.
Trichodesma stocksii
Trichodesma zeylanicum (Burm.f.) R.Br.

References

 
Taxonomy articles created by Polbot
Boraginaceae genera